Jason Alan Davidson (born 29 June 1991) is an Australian professional Soccer player who plays as a defender for Belgian club Eupen.

Club career

Hume City
On 26 January 2009, he signed with Victorian Premier League club Hume City, becoming the youngest starting member in the VPL at the age of 17. After having spent three years in the Japanese football development system. He garnered attention from several A-League clubs after being called up the Australian U-20 squad on 17 March 2009.
In June 2009 he left Hume City to pursue several overseas trials.

Paços de Ferreira
In September 2009 he signed with Portuguese club, Paços de Ferreira before being voted 2009 Victorian Premier League – Under 21 Player of the Year. Among serious interest from clubs such as European heavyweights VfB Stuttgart and Sporting CP, along with Turkish club Ankaragucu, Davidson also immediately received contract offers from A-League club, Newcastle Jets and another Turkey Super League club in Diyarbakirspor before signing for Paços .

On 16 January 2010, Davidson made his senior debut for Paços de Ferreira in the Portuguese Liga, coming on as a substitute against F.C. Porto being the youngest player registered in the Portuguese Liga Sagres at 18 in 2009–2010 Season.

Davidson suffered an ankle injury upon return from the 2010 AFC U-19 Championship and on 3 February 2011, was subsequently loaned to Liga de Honra outfit Sporting Covilhã for the remainder of the 2010–11 season for much needed game time after the long injury lay-off.

Heracles Almelo
Davidson joined Heracles Almelo in January 2012. Davidson had an excellent senior debut starting for Heracles Almelo in the Eredivisie on 25 March 2012 at the Polman Stadium against FC Utrecht. Davidson played center back and Heracles Almelo beat FC Utrecht 3–1 at home.

West Bromwich Albion
He moved to West Bromwich Albion on 5 August 2014, after an impressive World Cup campaign. On 23 August 2014, Davidson made his debut in the Premier League for West Bromwich Albion, after being subbed on for Sébastien Pocognoli in the 60th minute against Southampton and the game finished in a nil all draw.

Huddersfield Town
Davidson signed a three-year contract with Huddersfield Town on 26 June 2015. He made his début for the Terriers in a 2–0 defeat against Hull City at the KC Stadium on 8 August 2015. His first goal for the club came in their 5–0 win over Charlton Athletic on 12 January 2016.

Groningen
On 18 August 2016, Davidson was loaned out to Eredivisie side FC Groningen on a season-long deal. Davidson had an outstanding performance on his debut, 21 August 2016 against FC Twente in a thrilling game.

Rijeka
After being released by Huddersfield Town with a year left on his contract, on 28 August 2017, Davidson joined Croatian club Rijeka on a three-year deal. He made his début for Rijeka in a 3–1 away win against Vrbovec in Round 1 of the Croatian Football Cup on 20 September 2017.

Perth Glory 
On 13 July 2018, it was announced that Davidson would join A-League club Perth Glory on a one-year deal. In his first season for the club, the team finished first in the A-League and were crowned premiers of league.

Ulsan Hyundai 
On 19 June 2019, it was announced that Davidson would join K League 1 club Ulsan Hyundai on a two year contract.

Melbourne Victory
Melbourne Victory announced that they had signed Davidson for the 2021–22 A-League season on 16 July 2021.

International career

Davidson was called up to Australia U-20 squad on 17 March 2009 to compete in the Under 20 World Cup held in Egypt in September 2009. He was also called into Australia's initial 50-man squad prior to the 2011 Asian Cup, he was cut however from the final squad.

Davidson made his first full international debut on 15 August 2012 against Scotland in Edinburgh, coming on as a substitution just after half time and scoring an own goal after trying to clear a header. He played in all of Australia's group matches against Chile, Holland and Spain at the 2014 FIFA World Cup in Brazil. Davidson was named as part of Australia's 2015 AFC Asian Cup squad, which went on to win the trophy. He scored his first international goal in the semi-final against the United Arab Emirates. He was Australia's first choice to play left-back in that squad.

Personal life
Davidson was born and raised in Melbourne, Australia and is the son of international footballer Alan Davidson. Jason's paternal grandmother is Japanese and his mother, Effie is the daughter of Greek immigrants.

Career statistics

Club
Statistics accurate as of 21 May 2022

International goals
Scores and results list Australia's goal tally first.

Honours
Olimpija Ljubljana
 Slovenian PrvaLiga: 2017–18
 Slovenian Cup: 2017–18

Perth Glory
 A-League: Premiers 2018–19

Ulsan Hyundai
 AFC Champions League: 2020

Melbourne Victory
FFA Cup: 2021

Australia
 AFC Asian Cup: 2015

Individual
A-Leagues All Star: 2022
 PFA A-League Team of the Season: 2018–19, 2021–22

References

External links

1991 births
Living people
Soccer players from Melbourne
Australian people of Japanese descent
Australian people of Greek descent
Association football central defenders
Association football fullbacks
Australia international soccer players
Australian expatriate soccer players
Victorian Premier League players
Primeira Liga players
F.C. Paços de Ferreira players
Expatriate footballers in Portugal
Expatriate footballers in the Netherlands
Expatriate footballers in England
Expatriate footballers in Croatia
Expatriate footballers in Slovenia
Expatriate footballers in South Korea
Expatriate footballers in Belgium
Australian expatriate sportspeople in Portugal
Australian expatriate sportspeople in the Netherlands
Australian expatriate sportspeople in England
Australian expatriate sportspeople in Croatia
Australian expatriate sportspeople in South Korea
Australian expatriate sportspeople in Belgium
Eredivisie players
Heracles Almelo players
Liga Portugal 2 players
S.C. Covilhã players
Hume City FC players
2014 FIFA World Cup players
2015 AFC Asian Cup players
West Bromwich Albion F.C. players
Huddersfield Town A.F.C. players
FC Groningen players
HNK Rijeka players
NK Olimpija Ljubljana (2005) players
Perth Glory FC players
Ulsan Hyundai FC players
Melbourne Victory FC players
K.A.S. Eupen players
Premier League players
Slovenian PrvaLiga players
A-League Men players
K League 1 players
Belgian Pro League players
AFC Asian Cup-winning players
Australian soccer players